Duncan MacKinnon (born 2 May 1970) is a South African judoka. He competed in the men's half-lightweight event at the 1996 Summer Olympics.

References

External links
 

1970 births
Living people
South African male judoka
Olympic judoka of South Africa
Judoka at the 1996 Summer Olympics
Sportspeople from East London, Eastern Cape